Jasionno  is a village in the administrative district of Gmina Gronowo Elbląskie, within Elbląg County, Warmian-Masurian Voivodeship, in northern Poland.

Prior to 1945, it was part of Germany (East Prussia). Its population is approximately 250.

References

Jasionno